Halsnøy Abbey (Halsnøy kloster) was a house of Augustinian Canons located on the island of Halsnøy on the Hardangerfjord at Kvinnherad in Vestland, Norway.

History
Halsnøy Abbey  was one of the richest monasteries in medieval era Norway. The monastery is believed to have been founded in 1163 or 1164 by  jarl Erling Skakke (1115–1179) as an inducement to Archbishop Øystein to crown Erling's seven-year-old son, Magnus Erlingsson, who reigned as King of Norway from 1161 to 1184. 

The new foundation attracted many generous endowments and soon became one of the wealthiest in Norway.
The buildings were severely damaged in a fire about a hundred years later, and were rebuilt in Gothic style about 1300.

The monastery was dissolved in 1536 during the Reformation and its lands and assets were confiscated by the Crown. For over 200 years it was administered as state property, but in 1758 the estate was bought by the chamberlain Andreas Juel, in whose family it remained until 1956. Lt. Andreas Juel, a descendant of the purchaser, demolished the remaining monastic buildings in about 1840 and built a new house from the stone in 1841.

In 1956 the site was bought by  Sunnhordland Museum  which has  conserved the building remains. Previously known as Sunnhordland Folkemuseum, 
Sunnhordland Museum operates from administration offices at Stord and serves as the historic-cultural museum for all eight municipalities in the region of Sunnhordland.

Archaeological studies were conducted on site by architect Gerhard Fischer during 1938-1939 and by Hans-Emil Lidén between 1961-1963. Parts of the west wing with the abbey are preserved as ruins. Halsnøy is very unusual among Norwegian monastic sites in that what principally survives is not the principal monastic buildings (church, chapter house, etc.), but the smaller ancillary buildings. These survive at only two other pre-Reformation monastic sites in the country: Selje Abbey (Selje kloster) in the district of Nordfjord and Hovedøya Abbey (Hovedøya kloster) in Oslo.

Notes

Other Sources
  Halsnøy kloster Norges klostre i middelalderen 
  Halsnøy kloster Sunnhordland Museum

Related reading
 Lidén, Hans-Emil; Ellen Marie Magerøy (1990)  Norges Kircher  (Oslo: Gyldendal)

External links
Sunnhordland Museum website

Kvinnherad
Buildings and structures in Vestland
Christian monasteries established in the 12th century
Augustinian monasteries in Norway
1163 establishments in Europe
Religious organizations established in the 1160s
1536 disestablishments in Norway
12th-century establishments in Norway
Monasteries dissolved under the Norwegian Reformation